USS Rocket is a name used more than once by the United States Navy:

  was a wooden harbor tug J. P. Billard, was purchased for the Navy 12 October 1863.
  was a steel-hulled tug, built in 1899.
  was a coastal minesweeper, was laid down 6 September 1941.

United States Navy ship names